Sambell is a surname. Notable people with the surname include:

 Geoffrey Sambell (1914–1980), Australian Anglican bishop
 Jack Sambell (1908–1982), Australian footballer
 Kathy Sambell (born 1963), Australian sprinter
 Bill Sambell (1910–1974), Australian rower
 Darryl Sambell (1945–2001), Australian talent manager